Casto Nopo Abeso Evuna Ada (born 23 February 1973) is an Equatorial Guinean professional football manager and a former footballer. He currently coaches both Liga Nacional club Cano Sport Academy and is the assistant coach of the senior Equatorial Guinea national team, for which he has played during his playing career.

Career
In 2010, Nopo became the new caretaker coach of the Equatorial Guinea national football team.

In 2011, Nopo again became the caretaker coach of the national football team.

Until January 2014, Nopo coached The Panthers F.C. He previously coached the Akonangui FC

Achievements
Winners - Equatoguinean Cup: 2002, 2012, 2013

References

External links
Profile at Facebook

1973 births
Living people
Place of birth missing (living people)
Equatoguinean footballers
Akonangui FC players
US Bitam players
Equatorial Guinea international footballers
Equatoguinean expatriate footballers
Equatoguinean expatriate sportspeople in Gabon
Expatriate footballers in Gabon
Equatoguinean football managers
Equatorial Guinea national football team managers
Association footballers not categorized by position